Live at Sweden Rock – 30th Anniversary Show is a live album by the Swedish hard rock band Europe. It was recorded on June 7, 2013 at Sweden Rock Festival And released on CD, DVD and Blu-ray on October 16, 2013. It is the longest live concert done by band featuring over two hours and performed 28 songs from all albums.

Track listing
 Intro / "Riches to Rags"
 "Firebox"
 "Not Supposed to Sing the Blues"
 "Scream of Anger"
 "Superstitious"
 "No Stone Unturned"
 "New Love in Town"
 "In the Future to Come"
 "Paradize Bay"
 "Girl from Lebanon"
 "Prisoners in Paradise"
 "Always the Pretenders"
 "Drink and a Smile"
 "Open Your Heart"
 "Love Is Not the Enemy"
 "Sign of the Times"
 "Start from the Dark"
 "Wings of Tomorrow"
 "Carrie"
 "Jailbreak" (Thin Lizzy cover)
 "Seven Doors Hotel"
 Drum Solo
 "The Beast"
 "Let the Good Times Rock"
 "Lights Out" (UFO cover)
 "Rock the Night"
 "Last Look at Eden"
 "The Final Countdown"

Personnel
Europe
John Norum – guitar, backing vocals
Joey Tempest – lead vocals, acoustic and rhythm guitars
John Levén – bass guitar
Mic Michaeli – keyboards, backing vocals
Ian Haugland – drums, backing vocals

Guest performers
Scott Gorham – guitar on "Jailbreak"
Michael Schenker – guitar on "Lights Out"

References

Europe (band) albums
Europe (band) video albums
2013 video albums
Live video albums
2013 live albums